Tin Win Aung (born 14 April 1992) is a Burmese professional footballer who plays as a midfielder.

International career

International goals
Scores and results list Myanmar's goal tally first.

References

External links 
 
 

1992 births
Living people
Burmese footballers
Myanmar international footballers
Yadanarbon F.C. players 
People from Mon State
Association football midfielders